Li Chao (born 19 April 1980) is a Chinese professional golfer.

Li turned professional in 2003. He has played mainly on the Omega China Tour, winning several tournaments and the Order of Merit in 2005 and 2007. He has also played on the Asian Tour. He played in the 2010 WGC-HSBC Champions, finishing 75th.

Li lives in Shanghai.

Professional wins
2005 Beijing Leg (China), Hainan Leg (China)
2006 Shandon Leg (China), Kunming Leg (China)
2007 Yanji Golf Championship (China), Shanghai Leg (China), Xiamen Leg (China)
2008 Dell Championship (China)

Results in World Golf Championships

References

External links

Chinese male golfers
Asian Tour golfers
1980 births
Living people
20th-century Chinese people
21st-century Chinese people